Sir Samuel Synge-Hutchinson, 3rd Baronet  (22 April 1756 – 1 March 1846) was a 19th-century  Anglican priest in Ireland.

He was educated at Trinity College, Dublin; and was Archdeacon of Killaloe from 1785 when he succeeded his father until his own resignation in 1809.

References

Alumni of Trinity College Dublin
18th-century Irish Anglican priests
19th-century Irish Anglican priests
Archdeacons of Killaloe
Baronets in the Baronetage of Ireland
1756 births
1846 deaths